Nanjing East railway station is a freight railway station in Qixia District, Nanjing, Jiangsu, China.

History
The station was opened in 1908 and was previously called Yaohuamen station. In 1978, the name of the station was changed to Nanjing East. In 2007, a fence was erected around the station.

References 

Railway stations in Jiangsu
Railway stations in China opened in 1908